Pennsylvania's 33rd congressional district was one of Pennsylvania's districts of the United States House of Representatives.

Geography 
District boundaries set to cover parts of Allegheny County, Pennsylvania, near Pittsburgh, Pennsylvania.

List of members representing the district

References 

 Congressional Biographical Directory of the United States 1774–present

33
Former congressional districts of the United States
1923 establishments in Pennsylvania
Constituencies established in 1923
1943 disestablishments in Pennsylvania
Constituencies disestablished in 1943
1945 establishments in Pennsylvania
Constituencies established in 1945
1953 disestablishments in Pennsylvania
Constituencies disestablished in 1953